Stéphanie Michelini is a French actress.

Career
She debuted in 2004, playing the leading role in the film Wild Side, directed by Sébastien Lifshitz.

She is the one of the few trans women to have obtained some roles in French television and cinema, which still entrusts the majority of transgender roles to cisgender actors. Michelini had auditioned for the title role of the series , however, Claire Nebout was cast in the part.

She took part in a video installation of the artist SMITH, titled C19H28O2 (Agnès), as well as in SMITH's medium-length film Spectrographies, which she filmed with Mathieu Amalric at Père-Lachaise.

She was a member of the jury for the Chéries-Chéris film festival in 2012.

In 2019, she starred with actress Myriam Boyer in the short film Traverser la nuit, directed by Johann G. Louis. She won an Honorable Mention award for the role at the Two Riversides Film and Art Festival in Poland in 2020.

Filmography 
2004: Wild Side: Stéphanie
2008: 57,000 Kilometers Between Us: Nicole
2009:  (television series): Erika
2011: C19H28O2 (Agnès): Agnès
2013: Little Gay Boy: Convive
2013: Holy Thursday (The Last Supper): Convive
2014: One Deep Breath: Patricia
2015: Spectrographies: L'interlocutrice
2016: Where Horses Go to Die: Prostitute
2019: Traverser la nuit'': Daphné

References

External links
 
 Official site

Living people
21st-century French actresses
Transgender actresses
Year of birth missing (living people)
French LGBT actors
French transgender people